Dorothy Elizabeth Gish (March 11, 1898June 4, 1968) was an American actress of the screen and stage, as well as a director and writer. Dorothy and her older sister Lillian Gish were major movie stars of the silent era. Dorothy also had great success on the stage, and was inducted into the American Theater Hall of Fame. Dorothy Gish was noted as a fine comedian, and many of her films were comedies.

Early life
Dorothy Gish was born in Dayton, Ohio. She had an older sister, Lillian. The Gish sisters' mother, Mary Robinson McConnell Gish, supported the family after her husband James Leigh Gish, a traveling salesman, abandoned the family in New York. Mary Gish, who was "a former actress and department store clerk", moved with her daughters to East St. Louis, Illinois, where she opened a candy and catering business. In 1902, at the age of four, Dorothy made her stage debut portraying the character "Little Willie" in East Lynne, an adaptation of the 1861 English novel by Ellen Wood.

In 1910, Mary heard from her husband's brother, Grant Gish, who lived in Shawnee, Oklahoma and informed her that James was ill. He was in a hospital in nearby Norman, Oklahoma, so Mary sent 17-year-old Lillian to visit him. At first, Lillian wrote back to her 12-year-old sister Dorothy that she planned to stay in Oklahoma and continue her education, but after seeing her father she admitted she missed her mother and sister. So, after a few months away from them, in the spring of 1912, she traveled back. Soon afterward, their childhood friend, actress Mary Pickford, introduced the sisters to director D. W. Griffith, and they began performing as extras at the Biograph Studios in New York at salaries of 50 dollars a week. During his initial work with the sisters, Griffith found it difficult to distinguish one from the other, so he had Lillian wear a blue ribbon in her hair and Dorothy a red one. The girls, especially Lillian, impressed the director, so he included them in the entourage of cast and crew he took to California to produce films there.

Career

Dorothy and her sister debuted in Griffith's 1912 production An Unseen Enemy. She would ultimately perform in over 100 short films and features, many times with Lillian. Throughout her own career, however, Dorothy had to contend with ongoing comparisons to her elder or "big" sister by film critics, fellow actors, studio executives, and by other insiders in the motion picture industry. Such comparisons began even from the outset of the sisters' work for Biograph. Linda Arvidson, Griffith's first wife, recalls their initial work for the studio in her autobiography When The Movies Were Young:

Near-fatal accident, 1914
Dorothy Gish's budding film career almost ended on a street in Los Angeles the day after Thanksgiving in 1914. On Friday, November 26, the 16-year-old actress was struck and nearly killed by a "racing automobile". Newspapers and film-industry publications at the time reported the event and described the severe injuries Gish sustained. The near-fatal accident occurred as Dorothy was walking with Lillian at the intersection of Vermont and Prospect avenues. According to news reports, after the car struck her, it dragged her along the street for 40 to 50 feet. Other movie personnel who were standing together on a nearby sidewalk, including D. W. Griffith, witnessed Dorothy being hit. The following day, the Los Angeles Times informed its readers about the accident:
Subsequent news reports also describe the reaction of other pedestrians at the scene. The Chicago Sunday Tribune and trade papers reported that Dorothy's "horrified friends" rushed to her aid, with Griffith being among those who lifted the unconscious teenager into an ambulance and reportedly rode with her in the emergency vehicle. In addition to Gish's initial examination by the doctor identified by the Los Angeles Times, the Chicago newspaper and Motion Picture News stated that she was rushed to the hospital, where surgeons mended her "very badly torn" left side with "many stitches" and treated the area where one of her toes had been "cut off", presumably a toe from her badly damaged right foot. At the time of the accident, Gish was completing a two-reel romantic comedy with actor W. E. Lawrence. The film, How Hazel Got Even, had already been delayed once at Reliance-Majestic Studios due to director Donald Crisp's bout with pneumonia. Completion of the short was postponed yet again, for over a month, while Gish recuperated. Originally scheduled for release on December 27, 1914, How Hazel Got Even was not distributed to theaters until mid-February 1915.

1915–1928
After recovering from the 1914 accident, Gish resumed her screen career the following year, performing in a series of two- and three-reel shorts as well as in longer, more complex films such as the five-reel productions Old Heidelberg, directed by John Emerson, and Jordan Is a Hard Road, once again under D. W. Griffith's direction. Increasingly, Dorothy's appeal to both producers and audiences continued to grow in 1915, leading W. E. Keefe in the June issue of Motion Picture Magazine to recognize her as "one of the most popular film stars on the Motion Picture screen". In an article about Gish in the cited issue, Keefe also recognizes that Dorothy, career-wise, was finally emerging from her sister's shadow:
In 1916 and 1917, Dorothy continued to expand her acting credentials by starring in a variety of five-reelers for Fine Arts Film Company or "Griffith's studio", which was a subsidiary of Triangle Film Corporation. Her work in those years required filming on locations in New York and on the West Coast.
 
In the 1918 release Hearts of the World, a film about World War I and the devastation of France, Dorothy found her first cinematic foothold in comedy, striking a personal hit in a role that captured the essence of her sense of humor. As the "little disturber", a street singer, her performance was the highlight of the film, and her characterization on screen catapulted her into a career as a star of comedy films.

Griffith did not use Dorothy in any of his earliest epics, but while he spent months working on The Birth of a Nation and Intolerance, Dorothy was featured in many feature-length films made under the banner of Triangle and Mutual releases. They were directed by young Griffith protégés such as Donald Crisp, James Kirkwood, and Christy Cabanne. Elmer Clifton directed a series of seven Paramount-Artcraft comedies with Dorothy that were so successful and popular that the tremendous revenue they raked in helped to pay the cost of Griffith’s expensive epics. These films were wildly popular with the public and the critics. She specialised in pantomime and light comedy, while her sister appeared in tragic roles. Dorothy became famous in this long series of Griffith-supervised films for the Triangle-Fine Arts and Paramount companies from 1918 through 1920, comedies that put her in the front ranks of film comedians. Almost all of these films are now considered to be lost films.

"And So I Am a Comedienne", an article published in Ladies Home Journal in July 1925, gave Dorothy a chance to recall her public persona: “And so I am a comedienne, though I, too, once wanted to do heroic and tragic things. Today my objection to playing comedy is that it is so often misunderstood by the audiences, both in the theater and in the picture houses. It is so often thought to be a lesser art and something which comes to one naturally, a haphazard talent like the amateur clowning of some cut-up who is so often thought to be ‘the life of the party’. In the eyes of so many persons comedy is not only the absence of studied effect and acting, but it is not considered an art.”

She made a film in England Nell Gwynn which led to three more films. Gish earned £41,000 for these movies.

Sound era and return to stage
When the film industry converted to talking pictures, Dorothy made one in 1930, the British crime drama Wolves. Earlier, in 1928 and 1929, her  performances in the Broadway play Young Love and her work with director George Cukor renewed her interest in stagecraft and in the immediacy of performing live again. The light comedy had proven to be popular with critics and audiences in New York, in performances on the road in the United States, as well overseas in a London production. Those successes convinced her to take a respite from film-making.
 In 1939, both Dorothy and Lillian Gish found the stage role of a lifetime. “Dorothy and I went to see the New York production of Life with Father, starring Howard Lindsay and Dorothy Stickney,” Lillian wrote in her autobiography. “After the performance I said: ‘This is the play we’ve been waiting for to take through America.’” Lillian predicted the popular play would be a perfect showcase for all the people who had seen the hundreds of films featuring Mary Pickford, Dorothy, and herself. She was introduced to Lindsay backstage, and immediately surprised the producers with her enthusiastic desire to head the first company to go on the road, with Dorothy taking the same part for the second road company, and the movie rights for Mary Pickford. Pickford did not make the film version, but the Gish sisters took the two road companies on extensive tours. Another stage success later in Gish's career was The Magnificent Yankee, which ran on Broadway at the Royale Theatre during the first half of 1946.<ref>[http://www.playbill.com/production/the-magnificent-yankee-royale-theatre-vault-0000010282 "The Magnificent Yankee], Royale Theatre, January 22 – June 8, 1946. Playbill, New York, N.Y. Retrieved September 28, 2019.</ref>  Lillian in her pictorial book Dorothy and Lillian Gish repeats John Chapman's comments about her sister's work in that production: "'Miss [Dorothy] Gish and Mr. Calhern give the finest performances I have ever seen them in. She is a delight and a darling.'"

Television and final films
Television in the 1950s offered many stage and film actors the opportunity to perform in plays broadcast live. Dorothy ventured into the new medium, appearing on NBC's Lux Video Theatre on the evening of November 24, 1955, in a production of Miss Susie Slagle's. She and Lillian had previously performed that play together on screen, in Paramount Pictures' 1945 film adaptation.

"The truth is, that she did not know what she really wanted to do," wrote her sister, Lillian, in her autobiography. "She had always had trouble making decisions and assuming responsibilities, in some ways she had never grown up. She was such a witty and enchanting child that we enjoyed indulging her. First Mother and I spoiled her and later Reba, her friend, and her husband Jim. Reba called Dorothy 'Baby' and so did Jim. With the best intentions in the world, we all helped to keep her a child."

From 1930 until her death, she only performed in five more movies, including Our Hearts Were Young and Gay (1944), which was a hit for Paramount. Director Otto Preminger cast Dorothy in his 1946 film, Centennial Summer, and Mae Marsh appears in the film in one of her many bit parts. In the 1951 release The Whistle at Eaton Falls, a film noir drama film produced by Louis de Rochemont, Dorothy portrays the widow of a mill owner. On television during this period, she also made several appearances in anthology television series. Her final film role was in 1963 in another Otto Preminger production, The Cardinal, in which she plays the mother of the title character.

Personal life
 Dorothy Gish married only once, to James Malachi Rennie (1890–1965), a Canadian-born actor who co-starred with her in two productions in 1920: Remodeling Her Husband, directed by sister Lillian, and in the comedy Flying Pat. In December 1920, the couple eloped to Greenwich, Connecticut, where they wed in a double ceremony in which Gish's friend, actress Constance Talmadge, also married Greek businessman John Pialoglou. Gish and Rennie remained together until their divorce in 1935. Dorothy never married again.

Death and legacy
Gish died aged 70 in 1968 from bronchial pneumonia at a clinic in Rapallo, Italy, where she had been a patient for two years to treat hardening arteries. Her sister Lillian, who was filming in Rome, was at her bedside. The New York Times reported the day after her death that the United States consulate in Genoa was making arrangements to cremate "Miss Gish's body" for return to the United States. The ashes were later entombed in Saint Bartholomew's Episcopal Church in New York City in the columbarium in the undercroft of the church. Lillian, who died in 1993, was interred beside her.

In recognition of her contributions to the motion picture industry, in 1960 Dorothy Gish was awarded a star on the Hollywood Walk of Fame at 6385 Hollywood Boulevard in Los Angeles.

The (since renamed) Gish Film Theatre and Gallery of Bowling Green State University's Department of Theatre and Film was named for Lillian and Dorothy Gish and was dedicated on that campus in 1976.

Quotes

Partial filmography

References
Notes

Bibliography
 Casselton, Harold (ed.). Remembering Dorothy Gish. Minneapolis: The Society for Cinephiles, 1986.
 Croy, Homer. Star Maker: The Story of D. W. Griffith. New York: Duell, Sloan and Pearce, 1959.
 Gish, Dorothy. "And So I am a Comedienne". Ladies Home Journal (July 1925)
 Gish, Lillian. Dorothy and Lillian Gish. New York: Charles Scribner’s Sons, 1973.
 Gish, Lillian. The Movies, Mr. Griffith, and Me. New York: Prentice Hall, 1969.
 Slide, Anthony. The Griffith Actresses. New York: A. S. Barnes and Company, 1973.
 Talmadge, Margaret L. The Talmadge Sisters''. New York: J. B. Lippincott & Co., 1924.

See also

External links

 
 
 Extensive Dorothy Gish gallery
 The Dorothy Gish Project 
 Dorothy Gish at Virtual History

1898 births
1968 deaths
American Episcopalians
American expatriates in Italy
American film actresses
American silent film actresses
American child actresses
Deaths from bronchopneumonia
Deaths from pneumonia in Liguria
Actresses from Dayton, Ohio
Actresses from New Rochelle, New York
20th-century American actresses
Lillian Gish